The governments of Chile and Argentina are attempting to eradicate the North American beaver in the Tierra del Fuego area at the southernmost tip of South America. This non-native species was introduced in 1946 as a potential source of commercial fur trading. When the putative fur trade industry failed, the beavers became problematic and the governments agreed to intervene to wipe them out.  A June 2011 NPR report stated that the beavers have caused millions of dollars in damages. According to Nature, this plan is the largest eradication project ever attempted.

Background and history

In 1946, the Argentinian government imported fifty beavers from Canada, which were to be released in Cami Lake with the intention of creating a commercial fur trading industry. Though a viable industry ultimately failed to materialize, the introduction of the beavers into the region has had far-reaching consequences.

The North American beavers have no natural predators in the area. In their native habitats in North America, bears and wolves prey on the beavers and keep the population under control.  One observer noted that anyone considering importing beavers should also import bears, those being beavers' natural predators. According to a June 2011 NPR report, 200,000 beavers are living in the area.  Another report puts the number in excess of 100,000, and states the level of destruction as akin to having bulldozers thrashing through the area.

Tierra del Fuego National Park in Argentina is especially threatened, as the beavers are destroying long-protected trees. The animals have spread beyond Tierra del Fuego itself into the Brunswick Peninsula of Chile, and the government fears further penetration into continental South America. The beavers already threaten around sixteen million hectares of indigenous forest. Unlike many trees in North America, trees in South America often do not regenerate when coppiced, destroying the forest.

As well as felling trees, beavers create dams that flood certain areas and thus drown other trees and vegetation. Flooding from beaver dams also damages roads and cattle-grazing pastures. Ecologist Christopher Anderson, professor at the Universidad de Magallanes, has said, "The change in the forested portion of this biome is the largest landscape-level alteration in the Holocene — that is, approximately 10,000 years".

A 2017 survey among Tierra del Fuego land managers and researchers shows significant support in eradicating beavers and restoring the landscape. The support for eradication is strongest among managers while the support for restoration is stronger among researchers.

Methods
Some park rangers use steel traps that snap down on the animal's head and instantly kill it. Private individuals receive rewards for trapping beavers, although success has been elusive. Government officials plan to bring in professional trappers who have specialized dogs and use helicopters and boats to move in rolling fronts. The efforts have been subjected to scientific study.  Currently, the emphasis in the Tierra del Fuego National Park is on control, not on eradication.

See also
 Beaver drop
 Invasive beaver policies and impacts in Southern Patagonia
 Patagonia
 Tierra del Fuego Province, Argentina
 Tierra del Fuego Province, Chile
 Introduced species
 Invasive species

References

External links
 The beaver in Tierra del Fuego, short documentary with subtitles.
 Beavers. Patagonia Invaders, documentary feature film

Natural history of Tierra del Fuego
Beavers
Mammal pest control
Introduced species
Environment of Chile
Environment of Argentina
Pest control campaigns
Invasive species in South America